The indoor women's singles was one of six lawn tennis events on the Tennis at the 1908 Summer Olympics programme. Nations could enter up to 12 players.

Draw

Draw

References

External links
 
  ITF, 2008 Olympic Tennis Event Media Guide

Women's indoor singles
1908 in women's tennis
1908 in English women's sport
Tenn